Pimp is a 2018 American drama film written and directed by Christine Crokos and starring Keke Palmer. Lee Daniels served as an executive producer.

Plot
An urban gritty drama set on the streets of the Bronx. Wednesday, a female pimp, grows up learning the game from her dad. Once he's gone she is left looking after her prostitute mom, and her girlfriend Nikki. In need of more money to survive, Nikki turns tricks changing their luck. Rising up in the game, Wednesday continues to hustle hard for a dream of a better life for her girls and a ticket out of the ghetto. But when Wednesday pulls a stripper named Destiny, she comes face to face with a male Pimp who runs a more dangerous game. In a ferocious battle for survival of the fittest, Wednesday fights for love and risks all to protect Nikki.

Cast
Keke Palmer as Wednesday
Vanessa Morgan as Destiny
Edi Gathegi as Kenny Wayne
Haley Ramm as Nikki
Aunjanue Ellis as Gloria May
Lyrica Okano as Kim
DMX as Midnight John
Paola Lázaro as Louisa
 Mike E. Winfield as Science

Reception
On Metacritic, the film has a weighted average score of 44 out of 100, based on four critics, indicating "mixed or average reviews".

References

External links
 
 

2018 films
American drama films
Vertical Entertainment films
American LGBT-related films
LGBT-related drama films
2018 LGBT-related films
African-American LGBT-related films
2010s English-language films
2010s American films